Chondrus is a genus of red algae containing 11 accepted species:
Chondrus armatus (Harvey) Okamura
Chondrus canaliculatus (C.Agardh) Greville
Chondrus crispus Stackhouse
Chondrus elatus Holmes
Chondrus giganteus Yendo
Chondrus ocellatus Holmes
Chondrus pinnulatus (Harvey) Okamura
Chondrus uncialis Harvey & Bailey
Chondrus verrucosus Mikami
Chondrus yendoi Yamada & Mikami

References

External links

Red algae genera
Gigartinaceae
Taxa named by John Stackhouse